Barrie Stavis (June 16, 1906 – February 2, 2007) was an American playwright. He wrote several plays about men struggling in the vortex of history. His subjects include scientist Galileo, abolitionist John Brown, and labor leader Joe Hill. His play, Lamp at Midnight, about Galileo's struggle with the Catholic Church to get his ideas accepted, was performed and televised on the Hallmark Hall of Fame in 1966. Melvyn Douglas starred as Galileo.

Stavis's plays can be done on a clean, simple stage. They have been translated into 28 languages and have been produced in dozens of major theaters around the world and in numerous college theaters.

Stavis was actively working until his death on February 2, 2007, at the age of 100.

Major plays
 Harpers Ferry (New York: A.S. Barnes, 1960, 67). First new play in a classical repertory produced by the Guthrie Theater, Minneapolis, 1967: John Brown adopts guerrilla warfare to overthrow slavery. The raid fails and he is executed, but slavery is eventually abolished.
 Lamp At Midnight (New York: A.S. Barnes, 1966). First produced at New Stages, New York, 1947. Television adaptation Hallmark Hall of Fame, 1966: Galileo challenges religious dogma with science and finds enormous resistance to the truth.
 The Man Who Never Died (New York: A.S. Barnes, 1972). Joe Hill confronts power by organizing a trade union and pays with his life. First produced at the Jan Hus Theater, New York, 1958.
 The Raw Edge of Victory  in Dramatics (Vol. 57, No. 8 and 9; April and May 1986): George Washington leads a revolution to establish national independence.

Honors
 The National Theater Conference honors  an outstanding emerging playwright each year with the Barrie and Bernice Stavis Playwriting Award

Further reading
  Obituary for Stavis.

External links
 
 
 "Staging History: Barrie Stavis and the Dramatization of John Brown's Raid on Harpers Ferry" [online exhibition] from University of Delaware Library. Special Collections
 Barrie Stavis letters to Stanley Weintraub from University of Delaware Library. Special Collections

References

1906 births
2007 deaths
20th-century American dramatists and playwrights
American centenarians
Men centenarians